Meadowbank railway station is located on the Main Northern line, serving the Sydney suburb of Meadowbank. It is served by Sydney Trains T9 Northern Line services.

History
Meadowbank station opened on 1 September 1887 as Meadow Bank, being renamed Meadowbank on 6 November 1927.

To the south of the station, the line crosses the Parramatta River via the John Whitton Bridge. This opened in May 1980 replacing the original iron lattice bridge.

Platforms and services

Transport links
Busways operates one route to and from Meadowbank station:
507: to Gladesville and Hyde Park
518: Meadowbank ferry wharf to Macquarie University via Top Ryde and Denistone East

Meadowbank station is served by one NightRide route:
N80: Hornsby station to Town Hall station

References

External links

Meadowbank station details Transport for New South Wales

Easy Access railway stations in Sydney
Railway stations in Sydney
Railway stations in Australia opened in 1887
Main North railway line, New South Wales
City of Ryde